The English Stones are a rocky outcrop in the Severn Estuary between Caldicot, Monmouthshire, and Severn Beach, South Gloucestershire. Because the area is exposed at low tide, and is a rare spot of solid land in the highly tidal estuary, it has long been considered a good location to build barrages, dams or bridges. In the 1990s the construction of the Second Severn Crossing made use of the English Stones as a foundation for significant sections of the bridge.

References

External links 

Landforms of Gloucestershire
River Severn
Rock formations of England